Chahar Bagh (also Romanized as Chahār Bāgh and Chehārbāgh) is a village in Lavasan-e Bozorg Rural District, Lavasanat District, Shemiranat County, Tehran Province, Iran. At the 2006 census, its population was 84, in 24 families.

References 

Populated places in Shemiranat County